Wilbur Dyre Hart (born 1943) is an American philosopher and Professor Emeritus of Philosophy at the University of Illinois at Chicago. He taught at the University of Michigan from 1969 to 1974, the University College London from 1974 to 1991, and the University of New Mexico from 1992 to 1993.
Hart is known for his research on logic, philosophy of mathematics, metaphysics, and epistemology.

Books
The Engines of the Soul, Cambridge University Press, 1988
The Evolution of Logic, Cambridge University Press, 2010
 Hart, W.D. (ed., 1996), The Philosophy of Mathematics, Oxford University Press

See also
Philosophical Essays on Freud
Fitch's paradox of knowability

References

21st-century American philosophers
Philosophy academics
Living people
1943 births
American logicians
Philosophers of mathematics
Metaphysicians
Epistemologists
University of Illinois Chicago faculty
Academics of University College London
University of Michigan faculty
University of New Mexico faculty
Harvard University alumni